Sir Thomas Hinton III (c.  1574 – 1 February 1635) was an English politician who sat in the House of Commons twice between 1621 and 1625.

Hinton was of Wiltshire. He matriculated at Queen's College, Oxford on 15 October 1591, aged 17. He was probably knighted on 1 July 1619. In 1621, he was elected Member of Parliament for Downton. He was elected MP for  Ludgershall in 1625.

References

1570s births
1635 deaths
English MPs 1621–1622
English MPs 1625